Göinge may refer to:
Östra Göinge Municipality, a municipality in Skåne County, Sweden
Göinge Eastern Hundred, a hundred in Scania, Sweden
Göinge Western Hundred, a hundred in Scania, Sweden
 , Scania, organised in 1637 into the Eastern and Western Hundreds
Göinge Mekaniska, one of the leading Swedish steel building companies